Scutellastra kermadecensis is a species of sea snail, a true limpet, a marine gastropod mollusk in the family Patellidae, one of the families of true limpets.

Description
(Original description) The large and massive shell is conical with the apex subcentral. The slopes of the cone are nearly straight. The outline is short ovate, slightly narrower in front. The exterior is whitish, apparently strongly ribbed when perfect, but the specimens described are everywhere deeply eroded. The border is lightly scalloped by the ribbing, and finely puckered at the edge. Muscle-scar roughened, strongly marked, and either white or bright orange. The rest of the interior is white, stained in places with livid-brown or purplish.
Length 135, breadth 115, alt. 48 mm.

Distribution
This marine species is found off the Kermadec Islands.

References

 Koufopanou et al. (1999). A molecular phylogeny of the patellid limpets (Gastropoda: Patellidae) and its implications for the origins of their antitropical distribution Mol. Phylogenet. Evol. 11(1):138-156
 Marshall, B. A. (1981). Fossil collections from Raoul Island. Appendix 1. Pp 90-91 in Lloyd, E. F. & Nathan, S. Geology and tephrochronology of Raoul Island, Kermadec Group, New Zealand. New Zealand Geological Survey Bulletin 95.

External links
  Brazier, J. (1894). On a Patella said to have been found on the Kermadec islands. Proceedings of the Linnean Society of New South Wales. 19(1): 183-184
  Koufopanou, V., Reid, D.G., Ridgeway, S.A., & Thomas, R.H. (1999). A molecular phylogeny of the patellid limpets (Gastropoda: Patellidae) and its implications for the origins of their antitropical distribution. Molecular Phylogenetics and Evolution. 11(1): 138-156
 Ridgeway, S.A., Reid, D.G., Taylor, J.D., Branch, G.M. & Hodgson, A.N., 1998. A cladistic phylogeny of the family Patellidae (Mollusca: Gastropoda). Philosophical transactions of the Royal Society of London, Series B, 353(1375), 1645-1671

Patellidae
Gastropods described in 1894